Karl Gustav von Strandmann (1786–1855) was a Russian German military officer, a general of the Imperial Russian Army. 

He did not graduate from it, however, as in 1803 he joined the Chevalier Guard Regiment to fight in the Napoleonic Wars. 

After the defeat of Napoleon Bonaparte, he took part in suppressing the November Uprising in Poland and continued to serve in various command duties until his death in 1855.

Family
His son, was a lieutenant general in the Imperial Russian Army. Nikolai Karlovich Strandtman's son, Nikolai Nikolaevich Strandtman, later known as Nikon of Karoulia, was a military officer who later became an Orthodox monk and starets in Karoulia, Mount Athos.

References

1786 births
1855 deaths
Imperial Russian Army generals
Russian people of German descent
Russian military personnel of the Napoleonic Wars